The Australia women's national under-19 basketball team is the women's basketball team representing Australia for all international under-19, under-18, and under-17 women's basketball competitions, including the U19 Women's World Cup, Asian Championship, and the Oceania Championship. The team is nicknamed the Gems, an abbreviation for the word gemstone. In 1993, the Gems (which won a gold medal) won the Australian Institute of Sport Athlete (team) of the Year.

Competitive record

U19 World Cup
The first FIBA U19 World Championships were in 1985, and the Gems have participated in every tournament to date. From 1985, the under-19 World Championships were held every four years. From 2005, they are held every two years.

Statistics

Head coaches
  Paul Goriss – 2016
  Deanne Butler – 2018–present

See also

 Australia men's national basketball team
 Australia women's national basketball team
 Australia women's national under-17 basketball team
 Australia men's national under-19 basketball team
 Basketball Australia
 FIBA World Rankings
 Timeline of women's basketball history
 Women's National Basketball League
 Australian Basketball Hall of Fame

References

Under-19
Women's national under-19 basketball teams